Gedera, or less commonly known as Gdera, is a town in the southern part of the Shfela region in the Central District of Israel founded in 1884.

History

Gedera is in the Book of Chronicles I 4:23 and the Book of Joshua 15:36 as a town in the territory of Judah. Its identification with the site of modern Gedera was proposed by Victor Guérin in the 19th century, but was dismissed as "impossible" by William F. Albright who preferred to identify it with al-Judeira.

Tel Qatra, which lies at the northern edge of Gedera, is usually identified with Kedron, a place fortified by the Seleucids against the Hasmonaeans (1 Macc. 15:39-41, 16:9). It has also been identified with Gedrus, a large village in the time of Eusebius (fourth century). Eusebius identified Gedrus with biblical Gedor, which is a name also appearing on the Madaba map, but several other sites for Gedor have been proposed.

Tel Qatra was occupied from the Middle Bronze Age to at least the early Islamic period. Sometime between then and the Medieval period, settlement moved to the southern foot of the tell, where the Palestinian village of Qatra existed until 1948. Its peak was in the Byzantine period, when the tell had at least one large public building.

Gedera was founded in the winter of 1884 by members of the Bilu group, to the south of Qatra. Gedera was established on a tract of village land purchased for the Biluites by Yechiel Michel Pines of the Lovers of Zion from the French consul in Jaffa, Poliovierre. The first pioneers arrived at the site during the festival of Chanukah. In 1888, Benjamin and Mina Fuchs built Gedera's first stone house, later used as a Bnai Brith meeting house.
In 1912, a group of Yemenite immigrants settled in Gedera. During the British Mandate, Gedera became a popular resort due to its mild climate and fresh air.

In 1949–1953, thousands of immigrants from Yemen, Romania, Iraq, Poland, Egypt, Morocco, Tunis, India, Iran, Libya, and other countries were housed in tent camps.

The land on which Gederah was established had once been owned by the Palestinians of Qatra, who had lost it due to debts. They were cultivating it as tenant farmers when the Jewish owners arrived and resented the intrusion onto what they still thought of as their land. According to another account, the land was actually owned by Qatra, but had been assigned by the government to the nearby village of Mughar when Qatra disclaimed ownership to avoid a certain murder charge. Mughar then sold it to Polivierre, who sold it to Pines. This, and the close proximity of the two sites, led to poor relations between the communities that sometimes led to violent clashes. Israel Belkind, a member of Bilu, described Gedera's relationship with its Arab neighbors as among the worst in all the settlements. Haim Hissin, also a Bilu member, criticized the Arabs for their provocative behavior, but also blamed the Jews for being unfair and arrogant.

Qatra was depopulated by the Haganah on 17 May 1948.

In the 1950s, a neighborhood called Oriel ("light of God") was established for new immigrants with visual impairments. The immigrants worked in a sheltered workshop, and the neighborhood was specially planned to promote their independence.

On February 9, 2009, a Grad rocket fired from the Gaza Strip hit Gedera, marking the northernmost point in a round of 200 rockets targeting southern Israel.

Geography 

The town has an area of 14,500 dunams. Gedera is considered to be the southern edge of central Israel while Hadera is considered the northern edge, hence the Israeli expression "from Hadera to Gedera" to describe the most populated area in Israel.

Demography
In 1911, Gedera had a population of 140.

At the time of the 1922 census of Palestine, Gedera had a population of 140 inhabitants, consisting of 136 Jews and 4 Christians. The 1931 census, recorded 63 occupied houses and a population of 201 Jews and 7 Muslims. By 1945, the population had increased to an estimated 970 Jews.

Gedera today has a large population of Yemenite Jews. Most estimates put their population at 50% of Gedera, making it one of the few primarily Mizrahi towns in the Central District of Israel. In 2008, 1,700 Ethiopian Jews were living in Gedera.

Economy
The principal agricultural branches of Gedera in its early years were grapes and grains. Citrus and other field crops were added later. In the 1930s, several industries were established, and the moshava became a vacation resort with convalescence and rest homes.

Urban development 
Gedera's position near the large south-central cities of Israel (Rehovot, Ashdod and Kiryat Gat), low prices for private homes and the fact that it is a green and quiet town yet it is in the central district near Tel Aviv and Jerusalem make it attractive to Israelis. Gedera is one of the faster-growing towns in Israel, with a 7.9% growth rate.

New Gedera is an upscale neighborhood built by the Azorim company. A major shopping venue built by Azorim is the Gedera Mall, located in the southeast of the town. First opened in September 2007, Gedera Mall has small businesses along with anchor tenants from semi-major department stores from Israel and Europe.

The major road Highway 7 was recently constructed alongside the border of Gedera, linking Gedera directly to Israel's cross-country highway, Highway 6.

Landmarks

The Museum of the History of Gedera and the Biluim is located in a restored historical building at the end of Biluim Street. Beit Mintz, built by Dr. Moshe Mintz, doubled as a residence (western wing) and communal hall (eastern side). When Mintz died in 1930, he bequeathed the house to the people of Gedera. The house was used as a concert hall, a wedding venue and a move theater. In the summer, films were screened in the courtyard. In 1986, it was dedicated as a museum in the presence of the Mintz family. A concrete monument entitled "Bereshit Bara" ("Genesis") by the Austrian artist Ernst Degasperi stands in a garden opposite the museum.

The Sverdlov Hut is the one remaining hut built by the Biluim. It belonged to Chana and Yigal Sverdlov, who later left it to the city. A bell used to call residents for public meetings is located in the front yard. In 1885, the pioneers dug a 20x4x2 meter hole and covered it with a roof to use as a stable. Today, it has been restored, and is known as "Bor HaBilu'im".

The first designated school building was built in 1896. Later, the building became "Beit HaIkar", the Farmer's House, a meeting place for the local farmers.

The 16.5 meter water tower behind Yeshurun Central Synagogue was built in 1935. The bottom floor was used as a classroom. The top floor held a water tank, and served as a watchtower.

A sculpture garden in Gedera showcases the work of Yoma Segev, who creates sculptures from scrap and recycled materials.

Archaeology
A pottery workshop for the manufacture of Gaza Jars was discovered at Tel Qatra, an archaeological tel on the outskirts of Gedera. Gaza amphorae were used to ship wine and other foodstuffs across the Byzantine world.

Notable residents

 Gila Gamliel (born 1974), member of the Knesset for Likud and Deputy Minister in the Prime Minister's Office
 Moshe Kaplinsky, army general and businessman
 Agi Mishol, poet
 Avishag Semberg (born 2001), taekwondo Olympic bronze medalist

International relations

Twin towns – Sister cities
Gedera is twinned with:

See also
Alisa Flatow

References

External links

Pictures of Gedera
Gedera on Google Maps from Space
 Avner Hillman, Gedera – The Biluim’s Shack: Conservation and Rehabilitation of a Wooden Structure, Israel Antiquities Authority Site - Conservation Department

 
Local councils in Central District (Israel)
Populated places established in 1884
1884 establishments in the Ottoman Empire